The Hap Emms Memorial Trophy is awarded to the outstanding goaltender at the Memorial Cup of the Canadian Hockey League. The award is named after Leighton "Hap" Emms, a former NHL player, who had a 33 year presence in the Ontario Hockey Association as a coach, owner, general manager, pioneer of the game. During his involvement with the Barrie Flyers, Niagara Falls Flyers, and St. Catharines Black Hawks between 1945 and 1978; his teams appeared in eight Memorial Cup tournaments, winning four times. The Emms Trophy, and the Emms Family Award, are also named for Emms.

Winners 
List of recipients of the Hap Emms Memorial Trophy.

See also
List of Canadian Hockey League awards

References

External links
 History – Awards – Mastercard Memorial Cup 

Canadian Amateur Hockey Association trophies
Canadian Hockey League trophies and awards